Perityle lindheimeri, commonly called Lindheimer's rock daisy, is a species of flowering plant in the aster family (Asteraceae). It is native to the United States, where it is endemic to the Edwards Plateau of Texas.

Its natural habitat is in crevices of Cretaceous-age limestone rock, often near streams or springs.

Perityle lindheimeri is a perennial subshrub. It produces a yellow inflorescence, with both ray and disk flowers. It blooms from spring through fall.

References

Perityleae